Acleris ophthalmicana is a species of moth of the family Tortricidae. It is found in Japan (Honshu).

The length of the forewings is about 8 mm. The ground colour of the forewings is brownish, but paler, more brownish-grey in the costal and postbasal areas. The base is darkened with greyish brown and the costa is weakly striped. There are large stripes in the subapical area of the wing. The hindwings are brownish grey, but paler at the base.

References

Moths described in 1964
ophthalmicana
Moths of Japan